The Sedena Henschel HWK-11 was a joint project between the Mexican  Secretariat of National Defense (SEDENA) and Henschel Wehrtechnik GmbH of West Germany.

Development 
The HWK-11 came about at the request from the Mexican defense secretary for a new tracked armored troop carrying vehicle for the Mexican army. The HWK was mainly German designed although Mexico had some input in the design process in the form that Mexico set certain requirements and specifications for the vehicle and Mexico also designed the basic configuration of the hull.

Production 
In 1964 the first 12 vehicles were manufactured in West Germany and delivered to the Mexican Army while facilities were set up in Mexico to manufacture the vehicle locally. Initially 350 HWK-11s in multiple variants were to be manufactured for the Mexican military but the entire order was not completed. At least 40 vehicles were produced but the exact total number of vehicles produced has not been disclosed by the Mexican military.

Specifications

First Version - 1965 
The first versions of the HWK-11 were strictly troop transport vehicles with only a single turret mounted 7.62 MG3 machine gun that could be fired from within the vehicle. This initial version featured a 180 hp engine and a two image intensifiers, one for the driver and one for the machine gun operator.

Second Version - 1980 
In 1980 one vehicle was used to test the use of a one-man Helio FVT900 turret with a 20 mm cannon and a coaxial 7.62 mm machine gun. The upgrade also included the upgrading of the vehicles engine to the 6V-53 Detroit Diesel which produced 210 hp and allowed the vehicle to reach up to 70 km/h.

Third Version - 1993 
In 1993 the vehicle was upgraded one more time, given a more powerful engine (the type of which is unknown) and new German made M113 caterpillar road wheels. The most significant upgrade to this new version is the addition of a French design fully enclosed turret mounting a 7.62 mm machine gun.
Finish 1993

Medium tank 
A medium tank variant was produced in small quantities to be utilized as an infantry fire support vehicle. It features French designed turret mounting a 90mm gun borrowed from the Panhard ERC90 and a night vision system. The engine type fielded has not been publicly disclosed.

Comparable Vehicles 
 German Schützenpanzer Marder
 Soviet BMP-1
 United States M113 armored personnel carrier
 British FV432

External links & References 

 www.army-guide.com/eng/product990.html
 http://idd007kg.eresmas.net/art/hkw11/index.html

Tracked infantry fighting vehicles
Armoured fighting vehicles of Mexico
Military vehicles introduced in the 1960s